The 1977–78 Greek Football Cup was the 36th edition of the Greek Football Cup. The competition culminated with the Greek Cup Final, held at Karaiskakis Stadium, on 4 June 1978. The match was contested by AEK Athens and PAOK, with AEK Athens winning by 2–0.

Calendar

Knockout phase
In the knockout phase, teams play against each other over a single match. If the match ends up as a draw, extra time will be played. If a winner doesn't occur after the extra time the winner emerges by penalty shoot-out.The mechanism of the draws for each round is as follows:
There are no seedings, and teams from the same group can be drawn against each other.

First round

|}

Bracket

Second round

|}

Round of 16

|}

Quarter-finals

|}

Semi-finals

Summary

|}

Matches

Final

The 34th Greek Cup Final was played at the Karaiskakis Stadium.

References

External links
Greek Cup 1977-78 at RSSSF

Greek Football Cup seasons
Greek Cup
Cup